The Wexford–Missaukee Intermediate School District is an intermediate school district in Michigan, headquartered in Cadillac.

Most of Missaukee and Wexford Counties are served by the Wexford–Missaukee Intermediate School District, which coordinates the efforts of local boards of education, but has no operating authority over schools. Local school boards in Michigan retain great autonomy over day-to-day operations.

Composition
The Wexford–Missaukee Intermediate School District includes many public school districts and private schools.

Governance
The Wexford–Missaukee Intermediate School District is governed by a publicly elected board of education, who is responsible for hiring a superintendent to serve as the chief administrative officer of the agency.

Primary school districts
As of the 2015-2016 school year, the following communities are served by the following members of the Wexford–Missaukee Intermediate School District:

 Cadillac Area Public Schools
 Lake City Area Schools
 Manton Consolidated Schools
 Marion Public Schools
 McBain Rural Agricultural School
 Mesick Consolidated Schools
 Pine River Area Schools

Additional school districts
The Wexford–Missaukee Intermediate School District also provides services to additional schools and districts, including:
 Bear Lake School District
 Cadillac Heritage Christian School
 Crawford AuSable School District
 Kaleva Norman Dickson School District
 Northern Michigan Christian School
 Roscommon Area Public Schools

See also
 List of intermediate school districts in Michigan

References

External links
 

Education in Clare County, Michigan
Education in Grand Traverse County, Michigan
Education in Lake County, Michigan
Education in Manistee County, Michigan
Education in Missaukee County, Michigan
Education in Osceola County, Michigan
Education in Wexford County, Michigan
Intermediate school districts in Michigan